William Parkinson was an English professional footballer who played as a winger. He played two matches in the Football League for Burnley in the 1900–01 season.

References

Year of birth unknown
English footballers
Association football midfielders
Burnley F.C. players
English Football League players
Year of death missing